Mindstream (citta-santāna) in Buddhist philosophy is the moment-to-moment continuum (Sanskrit: saṃtāna) of sense impressions and mental phenomena, which is also described as continuing from one life to another.

Definition
 (Sanskrit), literally "the stream of mind", is the stream of succeeding moments of mind or awareness. It provides a continuity of the personality in the absence of a permanently abiding "self" (ātman), which Buddhism denies. The mindstream provides a continuity from one life to another, akin to the flame of a candle which may be passed from one candle to another: William Waldron writes that "Indian Buddhists see the 'evolution' of mind i[n] terms of the continuity of individual mind-streams from one lifetime to the next, with karma as the basic causal mechanism whereby transformations are transmitted from one life to the next."

According to Waldron, "[T]he mind stream (santāna) increases gradually by the mental afflictions (kleśa) and by actions (karma), and goes again to the next world. In this way the circle of existence is without beginning."

The vāsanās "karmic imprints" provide the karmic continuity between lives and between moments.  According to Lusthaus, these vāsanās determine how one "actually sees and experiences the world in certain ways, and one actually becomes a certain type of person, embodying certain theories which immediately shape the manner in which we experience."

Etymology

Sanskrit
Citta mean "that which is conscious". Citta has two aspects: "...Its two aspects are attending to and collecting of impressions or traces (Sanskrit: vāsanā) cf. vijñāna."  or santāna (Sanskrit) means "eternal", "continuum", "a series of momentary events" or "life-stream".

Tibetan
Citta is often rendered as sems in Tibetan and saṃtāna corresponds to rgyud.  is therefore rendered sems rgyud. Rgyud is the term that Tibetan translators (Tibetan: lotsawa) employed to render the Sanskrit term "tantra".

Thugs-rgyud is a synonym for sems rgyud.

Chinese, Korean and Japanese
The Chinese equivalent of Sanskrit citta-saṃtāna and Tibetan sems-kyi rgyud ("mindstream") is xin xiangxu.  According to the Digital Dictionary of Buddhism, xīn xiāngxù means "continuance of the mental stream" (from Sanskrit citta-saṃtāna or citta-saṃtati), contrasted with wú xiàngxù 無相續 "no continuity of the mental stream" (from asaṃtāna or asaṃdhi) and shì xiāngxù 識相續 "stream of consciousness" (from vijñāna-saṃtāna).

This compound combines xin 心 "heart; mind; thought; conscience; core" and xiangxu "succeed each other", with xiang 相 "form, appearance, countenance, phenomenon" and xu 續 or 续 "continue; carry on; succeed". Thus it means "the continuum of mind and phenomena".

Xin xiangxu is pronounced sim sangsok in Korean and shin sōzoku in Japanese.

Origins and development

The notion of citta-santāna developed in later Yogacara-thought, where citta-santāna replaced the notion of ālayavijñāna, the store-house consciousness in which the karmic seeds were stored. It is not a "permanent, unchanging, transmigrating entity", like the atman, but a series of momentary consciousnesses.

Lusthaus describes the development and doctrinal relationships of the store consciousness (ālaya-vijñāna) and Buddha nature (tathāgatagarbha) in Yogācāra. To avoid reification of the ālaya-vijñāna,

Dharmakīrti (fl. 7th century) wrote a treatise on the nature of the mind stream in his Substantiation of Other mind streams (Saṃtãnãntarasiddhi). According to Dharmakirti the mind stream was beginningless temporal sequence.

The notion of mind stream was further developed in Vajrayāna (tantric Buddhism), where "mind stream" (sems-rgyud) may be understood as a stream of succeeding moments, within a lifetime, but also in-between lifetimes. The 14th Dalai Lama holds it to be a continuum of consciousness, extending over succeeding lifetimes, though without a self or soul.

See also

Luminous mind
Metempsychosis
Personal identity
Reincarnation
Saṃsāra
Subtle body
Svabhava
Trikaya

Notes

References

Citations

Works cited

Further reading

External links

Rebirth: what happens to the body and mind at death?, a talk by Thubten Chodron
Reincarnation, a talk by 14th Dalai Lama

Buddhist philosophical concepts
Metaphors
Theory of mind
Religion articles needing expert attention
Buddhism articles needing non-English scripting support & specialist attention